McDonald Elementary School may refer to:
 McDonald Elementary School, Central Valley School District, Washington, United States
 McDonald Elementary School, Georgetown County School District, South Carolina, United States
 McDonald Elementary School, Mohawk, Tennessee, United States
 F. A. McDonald Elementary School, Seattle, Washington, United States (1914-1981), now reopened as McDonald International School
 
See also:
Macdonald Elementary School (disambiguation)